John Russell (15 March 1923 – 7 December 2005) was a Scottish footballer who played for Motherwell and Kilmarnock. Russell appeared in the 1952 Scottish League Cup Final, which Kilmarnock lost 2–0 to Dundee.

References

1923 births
2005 deaths
Date of death missing
Place of death missing
Footballers from Glasgow
Scottish footballers
Association football wing halves
Pollok F.C. players
Motherwell F.C. players
Kilmarnock F.C. players
Scottish Football League players
Scottish expatriate sportspeople in Canada